The Miss New Jersey's Outstanding Teen competition is the pageant that selects the representative for the U.S. state of New Jersey in the Miss America's Outstanding Teen pageant.

Maria Lynn Sooy of Ocean View was crowned Miss New Jersey's Outstanding Teen on June 24, 2022 at the Resorts Casino Hotel in Atlantic City, New Jersey. She competed in the Miss America's Outstanding Teen 2023 pageant at the Hyatt Regency Dallas in Dallas, Texas on August 12, 2022.

Results summary
The year in parentheses indicates the year of the Miss America's Outstanding Teen competition the award/placement was garnered.

Placements
 1st runners-up: Brenna Weick (2010)
 Top 7: Alaina Murphy (2019)
 Top 8: Alyssa Sullivan (2013)
 Top 10: Natalie Ragazzo (2012), Shereen Pimentel (2016), Brynn McKinney (2020)
 Top 15: Katie Berry (2006), Andie Babusik (2011)

Awards

Preliminary awards
 Preliminary Evening Wear/On Stage Question: Brenna Weick (2010)
 Preliminary Talent: Shereen Pimentel (2016)

Non-finalist awards
 Non-finalist Interview: Samantha Rizzuto (2015)

Other awards
 Outstanding Achievement in Academic Life Award: Samantha Rizzuto (2015)
 Outstanding Vocal Talent Award: Shereen Pimentel (2016)
 People's Choice Award: Natalie Ragazzo (2012)
 Teens in Action Award: Samantha Rizzuto (2015)
 Teens in Action Award Finalists: Nina Mojares (2017)

Winners

Notes

References

External links
 Official website

New Jersey
New Jersey culture
Women in New Jersey
Annual events in New Jersey